Zwerin is a surname. Notable people with the surname include:

Charlotte Zwerin (1931–2004), American film director and editor
Mike Zwerin (1930–2010), American jazz musician and writer